Santa Cruz de la Sierra is a municipality located in the province of Cáceres and autonomous community of Extremadura, Spain.

Prominent figures
Ñuflo de Chaves was born here and founded the city of Santa Cruz de la Sierra, Bolivia, in 1561.

References

Municipalities in the Province of Cáceres